The Cathedral of Christ the King in Atlanta, Georgia (United States) is the mother-church for the one million members of the Catholic Archdiocese of Atlanta.  The cathedral is located at what is popularly called "Jesus Junction" on Peachtree Road, between East Wesley Road and Peachtree Road, in Atlanta's uptown Buckhead district. At present, the parish is one of the ten largest congregations in the United States, with over 5,500 families. Christ the King School also occupies the property, with an enrollment of approximately 600 students.

History
The parish of Christ the King was established in 1936.  The congregation purchased approximately four acres of land for $35,000 and held early masses in the mansion that occupied the site. To construct the current cathedral, the parish demolished this structure and purchased adjacent land from the Ku Klux Klan which previously served as its headquarters.

Architect Henry D. Dagit, Jr., designed the sanctuary in the Gothic Revival (French Neo-Gothic) style with touches of Art Deco in the interior, especially on the stone reredos. The stained glass windows (restored in 2015-16 by Daprato Rigali Studios) were originally works of the Willet Stained Glass Studios of Philadelphia.  A 1939 issue of Architectural Record called it the "Most Beautiful Building in Atlanta".

On January 5, 1937, when Pope Pius XI proclaimed that the Diocese of Savannah, organized in 1850, would now be known as the Diocese of Savannah-Atlanta. Christ the King parish became the Co-Cathedral with the Cathedral of St. John the Baptist in Savannah.

On July 2, 1956, Pope Pius XII split the Savannah-Atlanta Diocese to create the Diocese of Atlanta. The Co-Cathedral became cathedral of the new diocese, and Francis Edward Hyland became its first bishop.

Construction of the school began in 1936, and it opened October 31, 1937, under the administration of the Grey Nuns of the Sacred Heart, with a blessing by Savannah Bishop Gerald O'Hara.  In 1940, the school added a high school curriculum which operated until 1958, when students transferred to the newly formed St. Pius X Catholic High School.

Like many churches all over the world, the Cathedral faced many challenges during the COVID-19 pandemic of 2020. They were forced to cancel many services and masses for a few months, and suspend others for even longer, such as the youth choir ministries, which are still not reinstated.

Mass and Services Schedule

Ministries 
As both the mother church of an Archdiocese and a large-sized parish, the Cathedral offers many regularly-meeting ministries. Those ministries include, but are not limited to:

Children's: Recreation (ie. Parish Soccer, Basketball, Volleyball programs), Altar Serving, and Children's Choirs

Adult Ministries: 20/30 Somethings, Adoration Guardians, Bible Study, Rosary Group, Women's Club, Men's Club, Knights of Columbus, Prayer Chain

Liturgical: Flower Guild, Lectors, Extraordinary Ministers of Holy Communion, Ushers, Wedding Guild

Choirs: Cathedral Choir, School Nova Choir, Cathedral Evening Ensemble Choir, Summer Ensemble, Hispanic Choir, Middle School Boys and Girls Choirs

Outreach: Funeral Ministry, Sandwich/Snack Bag Making Team (MUST Ministries), Baking Team, St. Vincent de Paul Society

See also 

List of Catholic cathedrals in the United States
List of cathedrals in the United States

References

External links

 
 Roman Catholic Archdiocese of Atlanta
 Cathedral of Christ the King: Photo Gallery by The Catholic Photographer

Christ the King Atlanta
Christ the King Atlanta
Christian organizations established in 1936
Roman Catholic churches completed in 1939
Roman Catholic Archdiocese of Atlanta
Roman Catholic churches in Atlanta
Gothic Revival church buildings in Georgia (U.S. state)
1939 establishments in Georgia (U.S. state)
20th-century Roman Catholic church buildings in the United States